On June 10, 2014, the Islamic State of Iraq and the Levant took control of Mosul, after the Iraqi troops stationed there fled. Troop shortages and infighting among top officers and Iraqi political leaders played into ISIL's hands and fueled panic that led to the city's abandonment. Kurdish intelligence had been warned by a reliable source in early 2014 that ISIL would attack Mosul, and ex-Baathists had informed the U.S. and the UK, but Iraqi Prime Minister Nouri al-Maliki and the Defence Minister turned down repeated offers of help from the Peshmerga. Half a million people escaped on foot or by car during the next two days.

ISIL acquired three divisions' worth of up-to-date American arms and munitions—including M1129 Stryker 120-mm mortars and at least 700 armoured Humvee vehicles from the then fleeing, or since massacred, Iraqi Army. Many residents initially welcomed ISIL, and according to a member of the UK's Defence Select Committee, Mosul "fell because the people living there were fed up with the sectarianism of the Shia-dominated Iraqi government."

On 21 January 2015, the U.S. began coordinating airstrikes with a Kurdish-launched offensive, to help them begin the planned operation to retake Mosul.

Once home to at least 70,000 Assyrian Christians, there were possibly none left in Mosul after ISIL took over; any who remained were forced to pay a tax for remaining Christian and lived under a constant threat of violence. The indigenous Assyrians of ancient Mesopotamian ancestry, whose history in the region dates back over 5,000 years, saw their churches and monasteries vandalized and burned down, their ancient Assyrian heritage sites dating to the Iron Age destroyed, and their homes and possessions seized by ISIL. They also faced ultimatums to either convert to Islam, leave their ancient homelands, or be murdered.

According to western and pro-Iraqi government press, Mosul residents were de facto prisoners, forbidden to leave the city unless they left ISIL a significant collateral of family members, personal wealth and property. They could then leave after paying a significant "departure tax" for a three-day pass (for a higher fee they could surrender their home, pay the fee and leave for good) and if those with a three-day pass failed to return within that time, their assets would be seized and their family killed.

Most female Yazidis from Mosul and the greater Mosul region (Nineveh) were imprisoned and occasionally killed for resistance to being sold as sex slaves. ISIL killed or expelled most minority groups and forcibly converted some Yazidi males and Christians to join them. Women were required to cover their bodies from head to foot in a strict variant of Sharia rule, and men were required to fully grow their beards and hair in line with ISIL edicts. Life in Mosul was one of violent oppression, where people suspected of activism against the occupiers, resistance activities, were brutally and summarily tortured and murdered.

During the occupation, residents fought back against ISIL. In one notable incident, they killed five ISIL militants and destroyed two of their vehicles.

While ISIL ruled Mosul with an extreme monopolization of violence and committed many acts of terror, some scholars argue that it also had a highly efficient bureaucratic government that ran a highly functioning state within Mosul's borders via sophisticated diwans (governing bodies).

Women 
Women were forcibly taken by ISIS men to become their brides. Women were required to be accompanied by a male guardian and women had to be fully covered up in black, head to toe. Failure to follow the regulations was punished by fines or male relatives being given 40 or more lashes.

According to Canadian-based NGO the RINJ Foundation, which operates medical clinics in Mosul, rape cases in the city prove a pattern of genocide, and will lead to a conviction of genocide against the ISIL in the International Criminal Court.

In August 2015, ISIL was reported to be selling captured women and girls to sex slave traders.

Persecution of religious and ethnic minorities and destruction of cultural sites 
ISIL issued an edict expelling (in effect ethnically cleansing) the remaining predominantly ethnic Assyrian and Armenian Christian Mosul citizens after they refused to attend a meeting to discuss their future status. According to Duraid Hikmat, an expert on minority relationships and resident of Mosul, the Christians were afraid to attend. Emboldened ISIL authorities systematically destroyed and vandalized Abrahamic cultural artifacts, such as the cross from St. Ephrem's Cathedral, the tomb of Jonah, and a statue of the Virgin Mary. ISIL militants destroyed and pillaged the Tomb of Seth. Artifacts from the tomb were removed to an unknown location.

Students from Muslim Shia and Sufi minorities were also abducted.

According to a UN report, ISIL forces persecuted ethnic groups in and near Mosul. The Assyrians, Kurds, Armenians, Yazidis, Turcoman, Mandeans, Kawliya and Shabaks were victims of unprovoked, religiously motivated murders, assaults, theft, kidnappings, and the destruction of their cultural sites.
 Mosque of the Prophet Yunus or Yunas (Jonah): On one of the two most prominent mounds of Nineveh ruins, used to rise the Mosque (an Assyrian Church year) of Prophet Yunas "Biblical Jonah". Jonah (Yonan), the son of Amittai, from the 8th century BC, is believed to be buried here, where King Esarhaddon of Assyria once built a palace. It was one of Mosul's most important mosques, and one of the few historic mosques on the east side of the city. On 24 July 2014, the building was destroyed by explosives set by ISIL forces. In March 2017, after ISIS was driven out, a system of tunnels were found under the mosque. Although all moveable items had been removed there were still Assyrian reliefs, structures and carvings along the walls.
 Mosque of the Prophet Jerjis (Georges): The mosque is believed to be the burial place of Prophet Jerjis. Built of marble with shen reliefs and last renovated in 1393, it was mentioned by the explorer Ibn Jubair in the 12th century and is believed to include the tomb of Al-Hur bin Yousif.
 Mashad Yahya Abul Kassem: Built in the 13th century, it was on the right bank of the Tigris and known for its conical dome, decorative brickwork and calligraphy engraved in Mosul blue marble.
 Mosul library: Including the Sunni Muslim library, the library of the 265-year-old Latin Church and Monastery of the Dominican Fathers and the Mosul Museum Library. Among the 112,709 books and manuscripts thought lost are a collection of Iraqi newspapers dating from the early 20th century, as well as maps, books and collections from the Ottoman period; some were registered on a UNESCO rarities list. The library was ransacked and destroyed by explosives on 25 February 2015.
 Mosul Museum and Nergal Gate: Statues and artifacts that date from the Assyrian and Akkadian empires, including artefacts from sites including the Assyrian cities of Nineveh, Ashur, Arrapha, Dur-Sharrukin and Kalhu (Nimrud) and the Neo-Assyrian site of Hatra. Their plans for extraction were accelerated when ISIL scheduled the destruction of the al-Ḥadbā 
 Turkish diplomats and consular staff were detained for over 100 days.

Human rights 

Scores of people were executed without fair trial. Civilians in Mosul were not permitted to leave ISIL-controlled areas. ISIL executed several civilians who tried to flee Mosul. The killing of civilians, enemy soldiers, and members of ISIL who were accused of offenses was a regular occurrence and peaked during the Mosul offensive.

Armed opposition 

The urban guerrilla warfare groups were called the Nabi Yunus Brigade after the Nabi Yunus mosque, or the Kataeb al-Mosul (Mosul Brigade). The brigade claimed to have killed ISIL members with sniper fire. In the countryside around Mosul, Kurdish and Assyrian militia also took up arms to resist ISIL oppression, and successfully repelled ISIL attacks on Kurdish and Assyrian towns and villages. Popular Mobilization Forces (PMF) — an umbrella group that’s predominantly Shia but now also includes Sunni tribal fighters, Christian militias and other non-military forces fought ISIS.

References

History of Mosul
2014 in Iraq
Military operations of the Iraqi Civil War in 2014
Islamic State of Iraq and the Levant in Iraq
Islamic State of Iraq and the Levant activities